Mount Kimbie is an English electronic music duo consisting of Dominic Maker and Kai Campos. Formed in 2008, the duo expanded on the musical template of the UK dubstep scene, releasing early EPs Maybes and Sketch on Glass to critical praise the following year. Their debut album Crooks & Lovers in 2010 received further acclaim and was listed as one of the defining albums of the decade by DJ Mag.

The band signed with Warp Records in 2012, and released their second album Cold Spring Fault Less Youth the following year, third album Love What Survives in September 2017, and a double album MK 3.5: Die Cuts | City Planning in November 2022. They have collaborated with artists such as James Blake, King Krule, and Micachu.

History

Early years: 2008–2011
Kai Campos is originally from St. Austell in Cornwall, while Dom Maker is from Brighton. They met at Southbank University in London, where Campos was attending university for the second time and Maker was studying film. They started making music together at a home studio in Peckham.

Arguably responsible for inspiring the term "post-dubstep", the duo released a series of acclaimed early EPs, including Maybes and Sketch on Glass, that expanded beyond the dubstep sound. The band's debut album, entitled Crooks & Lovers, was released on 19 June 2010 in the UK to critical acclaim. At the end of 2010, Crooks & Lovers was included in over thirty 'Best of 2010' lists, including NME, Mixmag, Resident Advisor, Pitchfork, Drowned in Sound, NME listed them at number 22 in their 30 Artists For 2011. In 2010, Mount Kimbie toured the UK, Europe and America. They were also involved in the festival circuit playing at The Great Escape Festival, Stag & Dagger festival, Glade Festival, Field Day Festival and Bestival amongst others. The duo were then invited to perform at Gilles Peterson's Worldwide Awards event in February 2011.

In March and April 2011, they embarked on a US tour which included performances at SXSW and Coachella. They also toured in Australia in March, selling out all six of their performances, with Australia's The Vine saying of their Melbourne performance, "They flesh out skeletal elements of tracks with alternative instrumentation, or accentuate features with subtle additions or substitutions. In this way much of the material aired tonight is invigoratingly bolstered, altered or augmented in some way. It makes for a stimulating performance." However, regarding a live realisation of Crooks & Lovers in Glasgow in early 2011 The Guardian said that "presenting such short tunes as standalone pieces when they might function better threaded together gives the set a disjointed feel."

The pair are closely linked to friend, producer and BBC Sound of 2011 runner-up, James Blake. He has collaborated with them live and lent his skills to the remixing of "Maybes" which features on the Mount Kimbie EP Remixes Part 1, released 12 April 2010, as well as contributing elements to Crooks & Lovers. They've also featured on his BBC Radio 1 residency. Mount Kimbie have produced remixes for The Big Pink, Foals, The xx and Andreya Triana.

Warp: 2012–2022
Mount Kimbie signed to Warp Records in June 2012. The group toured North America that year with Squarepusher. Tony Kus joined the duo as their live drummer from October 2012 to 2015. Since 2016, Marc Pell of Micachu and the Shapes and Andrea Balency have joined Mount Kimbie's live show on drums and keyboards. They released their second album Cold Spring Fault Less Youth in 2013. Mount Kimbie performed a full tour across the US and Europe in late 2013 to tie in with the launch of the album.

In September 2015, Mount Kimbie hosted a weekly residency every Tuesday, throughout September, with London based online radio station NTS Radio. The shows included guests such as James Blake, William Basinski and King Krule. In July 2016, Mount Kimbie announced they would be taking a break from recording and be heading out on the road. Playing a small number of European shows including Pitchfork Music Festival.

In 2016 Chance the Rapper sampled 'Adriatic' from their 2010 debut album on his mixtape Coloring Book on the track Juke Jam featuring Justin Bieber and Towkio.

A second 'transatlantic' NTS residency took place across April and May 2017, broadcasting out of both London and Los Angeles, and once again featuring guests including James Blake, Archy Marshall, Actress and Warpaint. On 3 April 2017, Mount Kimbie released a new track, "We Go Home Together" on Warp Records, featuring long time collaborator James Blake. This was followed by another new track, "Marilyn", featuring Micachu. The track was accompanied by a music video by fashion photographer Mark Lebon, featuring Lebon's sons, Tyrone and Frank, both of whom have previously collaborated with Mount Kimbie.

On 12 July 2017, Mount Kimbie announced that they would be releasing their third album, Love What Survives, on 8 September 2017. Alongside this they released a new track, "Blue Train Lines" featuring King Krule.

Love What Survives featured contributions from King Krule, James Blake, Micachu and Andrea Balency. The album received strongly positive reviews upon release; DIY gave the album a 4/5 review, describing it as "the most affecting work to date by some stretch", and Mixmag called the album "searingly brilliant" and rated it 8/10. Pitchfork rated the album 8.4/10, selecting it as their "Best New Music", as well ranking the album at 34th in their 50 Best Albums of 2017 list.

Mount Kimbie toured extensively across the world in 2017 and 2018 to support the album, including festival appearances at Pitchfork Music Festival, Primavera Sound Festival, Field Day and Electric Picnic.

On 9 August 2018, Mount Kimbie's compilation release as part of the DJ Kicks series was announced, featuring an original production by the duo titled "Southgate". In 2019 they released a four track live recording of the Warp NTS live session. In the same year they were commissioned by Adidas Originals to produce music for a new campaign.

In the recent years, they have collaborated with artists such as Slowthai, James Blake, King Krule, and Micachu.

On 15 September 2020, the trio Slowthai, James Blake and Mount Kimbie released their collaborative single titled "feel away"  which appeared on Slowthai's UK number one album Tyron.

In July 2021, Mount Kimbie announced the release of two tracks that were part of the 'Love What Survives' recording sessions, but did not make it onto the album. On 28 July 2021, the tracks entitled 'Black Stone / Blue Liquid' were released on limited edition vinyl and made available to download via their website until 30 July. An accompanying music video was made for the track 'Black Stone'. The video was directed by Peter Eason Daniels.

In November 2021, Dom Maker received a Grammy nomination for his co production work on James Blake's track 'Before'. The song was nominated for Best Dance/Electronic Recording.

MK 3.5: Die Cuts | City Planning: 2022–Present
In September 2022 the duo released two double-sided singles, each with tracks produced by an individual member. Dom Maker released the tracks "A Deities Encore," featuring Liv.e, and "In Your Eyes," featuring frequent collaborator Slowthai alongside label mate Danny Brown. Kai Campos released two techno-infused tracks, "Q / Quartz". Each were understood to feature on Mount Kimbie's forthcoming third album Soon after, Maker released the non-album track "Locked In" featuring Maxo Kream and Pa Salieu.

The album, entitled MK 3.5: Die Cuts | City Planning, was officially announced the day after "Locked In" was released. Rather than a straight collaboration, as on previous records, the album consists of two halves: one created by the now Los Angeles-based Maker, and the other the London-based Campos. It was released on Warp Records in November 2022.

Style
Mount Kimbie's early work drew from the contemporary UK dubstep scene while expanding beyond its typical scope. The Guardian described the pair as "leading an exploratory breakaway from bass-heavy dubstep towards a lighter, hazier style of electronica rich with drowsy ambience and chopped-up found sounds." According to Resident Advisor, in their work "dubstep is unraveled and reassembled from its brawny rhythms upward, connecting the dots between musique concrète, R&B, hip-hop, drone and the midnight gospel sounds of Burial." In 2009, Pitchfork Media described their music as making use of "sped-up vocal samples, little tunnels of ambience, unimposing synth patches, and syncopated percussion that sounds like someone putting away the silverware," clarifying that "their rhythms are still dubstep in DNA-- deftly syncopated, slightly off-center, ambiguously danceable-- but most of what they lay on top of the beat sounds like it's being dragged out from places dubstep usually doesn't go: R&B, post-rock, IDM".
 
The duo use field recordings to form major elements of their music. "It’s amazing what you can pick up with a field microphone. I mean, you might just hear someone riding around but when you slow it down it’s almost like there’s a beat to it. And then just taking little pockets of that rhythm and stretching it out. A lot of what we do is about experimenting with different little bits of tone that you don’t necessarily hear on the first listen... and then trying to make songs out of them."

Solo Work

Kai Campos 
In 2018 Kai Campos curated a techno-driven DJ-Kicks mix and has been DJing consistently ever since, including a b2b tour with Actress and headline sets at Printworks and Fabric.

Dom Maker 
Dominic Maker now lives in L.A. where he has produced for artists such as Jay-Z, Slowthai and James Blake.

Discography

Studio albums
Crooks & Lovers (2010, Hotflush)
Cold Spring Fault Less Youth (2013, Warp)
Love What Survives (2017, Warp)
MK 3.5: Die Cuts | City Planning (2022, Warp)

EPs
Maybes (2009, Hotflush)
Sketch on Glass (2009, Hotflush)
Blind Night Errand (2010, Hotflush)
Carbonated (2011, Hotflush)
CSFLY Remixes (2013, Warp)
WXAXRXP Session (2019, Warp)

Compilation
Mount Kimbie DJ Kicks (2018, DJ Kicks)

Remixes
 The xx – "Basic Space" (2009)
 The Big Pink – "Velvet" (2009)
 Foals - "Spanish Sahara" (2010)
 LV & Untold – "Beacon" (2010)
 Andreya Triana – "A Town Called Obsolete" (2010)
 Kelis – "Jerk Ribs" (2014)

References

External links

 
 

Musical groups from London
English electronic music duos
Male musical duos
Post-dubstep music groups
Hotflush Recordings artists
Warp (record label) artists